Panagiotis Kontoes (born 20 June 1996) is a Greek professional footballer who plays as a centre-back.

References

1996 births
Living people
Greek footballers
Greek expatriate footballers
Slovak Super Liga players
Super League Greece 2 players
Football League (Greece) players
Gamma Ethniki players
Panegialios F.C. players
MFK Zemplín Michalovce players
Acharnaikos F.C. players
Doxa Vyronas F.C. players
Niki Volos F.C. players
Apollon Larissa F.C. players
Apollon Pontou FC players
Thesprotos F.C. players
Association football defenders